(born 1 December 1976) is a Japanese archer, who won the silver medal in the individual competition at the 2006 Asian Games.

References

Living people
1976 births
Japanese male archers
Place of birth missing (living people)
Asian Games medalists in archery
Japan Ground Self-Defense Force personnel
Archers at the 2006 Asian Games
Asian Games silver medalists for Japan
Medalists at the 2006 Asian Games